Marjanak (also Romanized as Marjānak) is a village in Beyza Rural District, Beyza District, Sepidan County, Fars Province, Iran. At the 2006 census, its population was 135, in 32 families.

References 

Populated places in Beyza County